Terpersie Castle (originally built as Dalpersie House) is a 16th-century tower house in Tullynessle, Aberdeenshire, Scotland,  located  north-west of Alford. It is protected as a category A listed building.

History
The small Z-plan manor tower house was constructed in 1561 by the Gordon family. On May 16, 1645, a Sunday, Major Baillie on campaign against Montrose, burnt the house and plundered and destroyed the surrounding area before the arrival of Lord Balcarres.

Charles Gordon of Terpersie was an officer in Gordon of Glenbuchat's Regiment.  He was said to have been captured following the '45 Rising hiding in a recess in the upper part of the castle's roof.  Gordon was executed at Carlisle on 15 November 1746 aged around 60 years.

In 1665 it was restored after burning down. After 1885 it was abandoned, and stood in ruins during most of the 20th century. In the 1980s the castle was restored as a residence by architects William Cowie Partnership.

Characteristics
Terpersie is one of the earliest known Z-plan manor-houses, defined as a rectangular main block with towers at opposite corners.

References

External links

Houses completed in 1561
Castles in Aberdeenshire
Category A listed buildings in Aberdeenshire
Listed castles in Scotland
1561 establishments in Scotland
Fortified houses